Lorelie "Lorie" S. Masters (born 1954) is an American lawyer specializing in insurance litigation notable for her work supporting District of Columbia home rule and opposing human trafficking. She was a candidate for Attorney General of the District of Columbia in the 2014 election. She is currently a partner in the law firm of Hunton Andrews Kurth in Washington.

Activism
Masters supports budget autonomy and statehood for the District of Columbia. She served as a board member of D.C. Vote and at DC Appleseed, and advocated for voting rights for district residents. The National Law Journal described her as a "champion" for her pro bono work on voting rights, D.C. election law, diversity and inclusion issues. She assisted the Council of the District of Columbia in efforts to fight voting machine irregularities. Masters has worked for women's rights and on behalf of victims of human trafficking.

Attorney General race
In 2014, Masters ran unsuccessfully in the District of Columbia's first-ever election for the position of Attorney General. Her campaign released mailing pieces which The Washington Post described as "text-heavy", a television advertisement that focused on her anti-corruption work, and a series of advertisements critical of opponents Karl Racine and Paul Zukerberg.

Insurance litigation
Masters is a specialist in the area of insurance law. In 1997, she won a victory for plastics maker Hoechst Celanese in a landmark case. Her views on insurance law have been published in magazines and journals which cover insurance law  including Benchmark Litigation, Super Lawyers, and Law 360 magazine.

Publications

References

External links
 Lorie Masters for Attorney General campaign website
 Lorie Masters on courtesy

1954 births
Lawyers from Washington, D.C.
Living people
Notre Dame Law School alumni
Washington, D.C., Democrats
People from Fremont, Michigan